The 2014 Montreal Impact season was the club's third season Major League Soccer, the top flight of both American and Canadian soccer.

For the 2014 season, outside of MLS, the Impact competed in the 2014 Canadian Championship, Canada's domestic cup competition and the CONCACAF Champions League.

Background 

Alessandro Nesta retired after last season. Options were declined for Paolo DelPiccolo, Maximiliano Leonel Rodríguez, and Siniša Ubiparipović. Zarek Valentin left on a free transfer to FK Bodø/Glimt. Nelson Rivas became a free agent. Loans ended for Andrés Romero, Daniele Paponi, and Andrea Pisanu. Davy Arnaud was traded for an international roster slot in 2014 and 2015. Marco Schallibaum was fired as head coach. Frank Klopas replaced Schallibaum. Montreal opened pre–season training camp on January 28 and will participate in the Walt Disney World Pro Soccer Classic.

Transfers

In

Out

Loans In

Loans Out

International caps 
Players called for senior international duty during the 2014 season while under contract with the Montreal Impact.

Competitions

Pre-season matches

Walt Disney World Pro Soccer Classic

Major League Soccer

Review

March 
The Montreal Impact started their season on March 8 against FC Dallas with a 3–2 loss. Sanna Nyassi and Andrew Wenger scored for Montreal and Fabián Castillo, Blas Pérez, and Mauro Díaz scored for Dallas. Marco Di Vaio and Andrés Romero are suspended for the first 3 matches of the season. Montreal went on to face Houston Dynamo on March 2. Houston won 1–0 from a deflected shot by Will Bruin. Patrice Bernier had a 30–yard shot "pushed" over the crossbar and Andrew Wenger had a shot cleared over the crossbar.

Table

Conference

Overall

Results summary

Fixtures & results

MLS Reserve league

Reserve fixtures & results

Canadian championship

Bracket 

The three Major League Soccer and two NASL Canadian clubs have been seeded according to their final position in 2013 league play, with both NASL clubs playing in the preliminary round, the winner of which advances to the semifinals.

All rounds of the competition are played via a two leg home and away knock-out format. The higher seeded team has the option of deciding which leg it plays at home, usually the second leg. The team which scores the greater aggregate of goals in the two matches advances. As previous years, the team that comes on top on aggregate for the two matches is declared champion and earns the right to represent Canada in the 2014–15 CONCACAF Champions League.

 Each round is a two-game aggregate goal series with the away goals rule.

Semifinals

Fixtures and results

CONCACAF Champions League

Group stage

Player information

Squad information

Squad and statistics

Appearances, minutes played, and goals scored

Multi–goal games

Goals against average 

{| border="1" cellpadding="4" cellspacing="0" style="margin: 1em 1em 1em 1em 0; background: #f9f9f9; border: 1px #aaa solid; border-collapse: collapse; font-size: 95%; text-align: center;"
|-
| rowspan="2" style="width:1%; text-align:center;"|No.
| rowspan="2" style="width:70px; text-align:center;"|Nat.
| rowspan="2" style="width:44%; text-align:center;"|Player
| colspan="3" style="text-align:center;"|Total
| colspan="3" style="text-align:center;"|Major League Soccer
| colspan="3" style="text-align:center;"|Canadian Championship
| colspan="3" style="text-align:center;"|CONCACAF Champions League
|-
|MIN
|GA
|GAA
|MIN
|GA
|GAA
|MIN
|GA
|GAA
|MIN
|GA
|GAA
|-
| style="text-align: right;" |1
|
| style="text-align: left;" |Troy Perkins
|1890
|35
|1.67
|1890
|35
|1.67
|0
|0
|0.00
|0
|0
|0.00
|-
| style="text-align: right;" |30
|
| style="text-align: left;" |Evan Bush
|1890
|31
|1.48
|1170
|23
|1.77
|360
|5
|1.25
|360
|3
|0.75
|-
| style="text-align: right;" |40
|
| style="text-align: left;" |Maxime Crépeau
|0
|0
|0.00
|0
|0
|0.00
|0
|0
|0.00
|0
|0
|0.00

Top scorers 

{| class="wikitable sortable alternance"  style="font-size:85%; text-align:center; line-height:14px; width:60%;"
|-
!width=10|No.
!width=10|Nat.
! scope="col" style="width:275px;"|Player
!width=10|Pos.
!width=80|Major League Soccer
!width=80|Canadian Championship
!width=80|CONCACAF Champions League
!width=80|TOTAL
|-
|9||  || Marco Di Vaio                    || FW || 9 ||  ||4 || 13
|-
|99||  || Jack McInerney                  || FW || 7 || 3 || 1 || 11
|-
|15||  || Andrés Romero   || FW || 6 ||  ||1 || 7
|-
|7||  || Felipe || MF || 3 || 1 || || 4
|-
|10||  || Ignacio Piatti                    || MF || 4 ||  || || 4
|-
|11||  || Dilly Duka                    || MF || 3 ||  || || 3
|-
|51||  || Maxim Tissot                    || DF || 2 ||  || || 2
|-
|5||  || Jeb Brovsky || DF || || 1 || || 1
|-
|6||  || Hassoun Camara                    || DF || 1 ||  || || 1
|-
|8||  || Patrice Bernier || MF || || 1 || || 1
|-
|11||  || Sanna Nyassi                    || MF || 1 ||  || || 1
|-
|16||  || Calum Mallace                    || MF || 1 ||  || || 1
|-
|21||  || Justin Mapp || MF || || 1 || || 1
|-
|33||  || Andrew Wenger             || FW || 1 ||  || || 1
|-
|- class="sortbottom"
| colspan="4"|Totals|| 38 || 7 ||6 ||51

Italic: denotes player left the club during the season.

Top assists 

{| class="wikitable sortable alternance"  style="font-size:85%; text-align:center; line-height:14px; width:60%;"
|-
!width=10|No.
!width=10|Nat.
! scope="col" style="width:275px;"|Player
!width=10|Pos.
!width=80|Major League Soccer
!width=80|Canadian Championship
!width=80|CONCACAF Champions League
!width=80|TOTAL
|-
|21||  || Justin Mapp                    || MF || 8 || 2 || || 10
|-
|7||  || Felipe || MF || 6 ||  ||1 || 7
|-
|8||  || Patrice Bernier          || MF || 3 || 2 || || 5
|-
|9||  || Marco Di Vaio            || FW || 4 ||  ||1 || 5
|-
|15||  || Andrés Romero          || FW || 3 ||  || 1 || 4
|-
|10||  || Ignacio Piatti   || MF ||1 ||  || 2 || 3
|-
|11||  || Dilly Duka          || MF || 3 ||  || || 3
|-
|16||  || Calum Mallace          || MF || 3 ||  || || 3
|-
|1||  || Troy Perkins          || GK || 1 ||  || || 1
|-
|3||  || Eric Miller          || DF || 1 ||  || || 1
|-
|6||  || Hassoun Camara          || DF || 1 ||  || || 1
|-
|11||  || Sanna Nyassi            || MF ||  || 1 || || 1
|-
|23||  || Hernán Bernardello   || MF ||  || 1 || || 1
|-
|23||  || Krzysztof Król          || DF || 1 ||  || || 1
|-
|55||  || Wandrille Lefèvre          || DF || 1 ||  || || 1
|-
|98||  || Mamadou Danso          || DF || 1 ||  || || 1
|-
|99||  || Jack McInerney          || FW || 1 ||  || || 1
|-
|- class="sortbottom"
| colspan="4"|Totals|| 38 || 6 ||5 ||49

Italic: denotes player left the club during the season.

Clean sheets 

{| class="wikitable sortable alternance"  style="font-size:85%; text-align:center; line-height:14px; width:60%;"
|-
!width=10|No.
!width=10|Nat.
! scope="col" style="width:275px;"|Player
!width=80|Major League Soccer
!width=80|Canadian Championship
!width=80|CONCACAF Champions League
!width=80|TOTAL
|-
|30||  || Evan Bush                     || 3 || 1 || 2 || 6
|-
|1||  || Troy Perkins                     || 5 ||  ||  || 5
|-
|- class="sortbottom"
| colspan="3"|Totals|| 8 || 1 || 2 || 11

Own goals 

{| class="wikitable sortable alternance"  style="font-size:85%; text-align:center; line-height:14px; width:60%;"
|-
!width=10|No.
!width=10|Nat.
! scope="col" style="width:275px;"|Player
!width=10|Pos.
!width=80|Major League Soccer
!width=80|Canadian Championship
!width=80|CONCACAF Champions League
!width=80|TOTAL
|-
|1||  || Troy Perkins                    || GK || 1 ||  || || 1
|-
|16||  || Calum Mallace                  || MF || 1 ||  || || 1
|- class="sortbottom"
| colspan="4"|Totals|| 2 || 0 || 0 ||2

Top minutes played 

{| class="wikitable sortable alternance"  style="font-size:85%; text-align:center; line-height:14px; width:60%;"
|-
!width=10|No.
!width=10|Nat.
!scope="col" style="width:275px;"|Player
!width=10|Pos.
!width=80|Major League Soccer
!width=80|Canadian Championship
!width=80|CONCACAF Champions League
!width=80|TOTAL
|-
|6||  || |Hassoun Camara                  || DF || 2365 || 360  || 252 || 2977
|-
|7||  || |Felipe|| MF || 2456 || 149 || 163 || 2768
|-
|15||  || Andrés Romero        || FW || 2185 || 186 || 347 || 2718
|-
|13||  || Matteo Ferrari                  || DF || 2148 ||   || 360 || 2508
|-
|44||  || Heath Pearce                    || DF || 1822 || 360 || 180 || 2362
|-
|8||  || |Patrice Bernier                 || MF || 1802 || 351 || 207 || 2360
|-
|99||  || Jack McInerney                  || FW || 1804 || 299 || 98 || 2201
|-
|9||  || Marco Di Vaio                    || FW || 1739 || 180 || 248 || 2167
|-
|21||  || |Justin Mapp                    || MF || 1726 || 240 || 69 || 2035
|-
|1||  || Troy Perkins                     || GK || 1890 ||  ||  || 1890
|-
|30||  || Evan Bush                     || GK || 1170 ||  360 || 360  || 1890
|-

Discipline

Yellow and red cards

Suspensions 

(CONCACAF Match)

Other player information

Allocation ranking

International roster slots 
Montreal has eleven MLS International Roster Slots for use in the 2014 season. Each club in Major League Soccer is allocated eight international roster spots and Montreal acquired the extra slots in trades with Colorado Rapids, Seattle Sounders FC and 2 from D.C. United. The Montreal Impact traded 1 of their slots to FC Dallas

  – Player is Canadian citizen;
  – Player is U.S. citizen;
 G – Player has U.S. green card;
 C – Player has permanent Canadian residency.

Management 

 Sporting director — Vacant
 Technical director —  Matt Jordan
 Director, Montreal Impact Academy —  Philippe Eullaffroy
 Head coach, Director of Player Personnel —  Frank Klopas
 Assistant coach —  Mauro Biello
 Assistant coach —  Enzo Concina
 Goalkeeping coach —  Youssef Dahha
 Physical Preparation Coach —  Paolo Pacione
 Team Administrator —  Daniel Pozzi
 Equipment Coordinator —  Remy Eyckerman
 Equipment Manager —  Aldo Ricciuti
 Players Service —  Bradley Adam Smith

Recognition

MLS Team of the Week

MLS Player of the Week

References 

CF Montréal seasons
Montreal Impact
Montreal Impact
Montreal Impact